Edge of the Earth is a 2022 HBO documentary television miniseries that follows four different extreme sports expeditions undertaken by elite athletes. Each episode follows a different group traveling to a remote area. The outdoor sports highlighted are snowboarding, kayaking, rock climbing, and surfing. Everywhere the athletes go, they witness the impact of climate change and industry on the landscape and society. The series was filmed during the COVID-19 pandemic.

Production
The series was created and directed by brothers Todd Jones and Steve Jones, founders of production company Teton Gravity Research (TGR). Talks to develop the series began between TGB and HBO in the summer of 2019. There were early plans to shoot in China, but this did not occur due to the outbreak of the COVID-19 pandemic. The show was filmed during the pandemic and, as a result, the athletes and filmmaking crew underwent regular testing. The pandemic also led to logistical challenges as the team navigated areas with travel bans. The production team consisted of more than 60 people in total. In each location, cinematography was handled by experts in their respective sports.

Cast
Elena Hight
Jeremy Jones
Griffin Post
Nouria Newman
Ben Stookesberry
Erik Boomer
Emily Harrington
Adrian Ballinger
Grant Baker
Ian Walsh

Episodes

Reception
Scott Hines of Decider praised the show, writing it avoided "being corny" by making "something that’s simultaneously breathtakingly beautiful and utterly terrifying." Michelle Bruton at Forbes felt the show did a good job appealing to both those involved in action sports and those where were more casually interested. Graham Averill at Outside likened the extreme sports as "almost a sideshow" and wrote "The films are at their most compelling when they focus on the human element of the expeditions."

References

External links
 
 

HBO original programming
2022 American television series debuts
Documentary television series about sports
2020s American documentary television series